The 1992 DieHard 500 was the 17th stock car race of the 1992 NASCAR Winston Cup Series season and the 24th iteration of the event. The race was held on Sunday, July 26, 1992, in Lincoln, Alabama at Talladega Superspeedway, a 2.66 miles (4.28 km) permanent triangle-shaped superspeedway. The race took the scheduled 188 laps to complete. At race's end, Morgan–McClure Motorsports driver Ernie Irvan would manage to come back from a lap deficit and best out Junior Johnson & Associates driver Sterling Marlin by 19 thousandths of a second to take his sixth career NASCAR Winston Cup Series and his third and final victory of the season. To fill out the top three, the aforementioned Sterling Marlin and Robert Yates Racing driver Davey Allison would finish second and third, respectively.

With the help of relief driver Bobby Hillin Jr., Davey Allison would manage to retake the driver's championship lead after losing it in the previous race, leading second-place driver Bill Elliott by one point.

Background 

Talladega Superspeedway, originally known as Alabama International Motor Superspeedway (AIMS), is a motorsports complex located north of Talladega, Alabama. It is located on the former Anniston Air Force Base in the small city of Lincoln. The track is a tri-oval and was constructed in the 1960s by the International Speedway Corporation, a business controlled by the France family. Talladega is most known for its steep banking and the unique location of the start/finish line that's located just past the exit to pit road. The track currently hosts the NASCAR series such as the NASCAR Cup Series, Xfinity Series and the Camping World Truck Series. Talladega is the longest NASCAR oval, a  tri-oval like the Daytona International Speedway, which also is a  tri-oval.

Entry list 

 (R) denotes rookie driver.

*Due to injuries sustained in a crash at the 1992 Miller Genuine Draft 500, Allison would be replaced by relief driver Bobby Hillin Jr. for qualifying. During the race, Allison would manage to start the race, before being replaced by Hillin Jr. As a result of starting the race, Allison is credited with the finish.

Qualifying 
Qualifying was split into two rounds. The first round was held on Friday, July 24, at 4:00 PM EST. Each driver would have one lap to set a time. During the first round, the top 20 drivers in the round would be guaranteed a starting spot in the race. If a driver was not able to guarantee a spot in the first round, they had the option to scrub their time from the first round and try and run a faster lap time in a second round qualifying run, held on Saturday, July 25, at 10:00 AM EST. As with the first round, each driver would have one lap to set a time. For this specific race, positions 21-40 would be decided on time, and depending on who needed it, a select amount of positions were given to cars who had not otherwise qualified but were high enough in owner's points; up to two provisionals were given. If needed, a past champion who did not qualify on either time or provisionals could use a champion's provisional, adding one more spot to the field.

No drivers would fail to qualify.

Full qualifying results

Race results

Standings after the race 

Drivers' Championship standings

Note: Only the first 10 positions are included for the driver standings.

References 

1992 NASCAR Winston Cup Series
NASCAR races at Talladega Superspeedway
July 1992 sports events in the United States
1992 in sports in Alabama